The 2018–19 Fordham Rams women's basketball team represents Fordham University during the 2018–19 NCAA Division I women's basketball season. The Rams are led by eighth-year head coach Stephanie Gaitley. They were members of the Atlantic 10 Conference and play their home games at the Rose Hill Gymnasium. They finished the season 25–9, 13–3 in A-10 play to win share the regular season title with VCU. Fordham won the Atlantic 10 Conference tournament championship game over VCU, 62–47. They lost in the first round to Syracuse.

Media

Forham Rams Sports Network
Forham Rams games will be broadcast on WFUV Sports and streamed online through the Fordham Portal. Most home games will also be featured on the A-10 Digital Network. Select games will be televised.

Roster

Schedule

|-
!colspan=9 style=| Exhibition

|-
!colspan=9 style=| Non-conference regular season

|-
!colspan=9 style=| Atlantic 10 regular season

|-
!colspan=9 style=| Atlantic 10 Women's Tournament

|-
!colspan=9 style=| NCAA Women's Tournament

Rankings
2018–19 NCAA Division I women's basketball rankings

See also
 2018–19 Fordham Rams men's basketball team

References

Fordham
Fordham Rams women's basketball seasons
Fordham
Fordham
Fordham